Between Desire and Uncertainty (Entre désir et incertitude) is a Moroccan 2010 documentary film.

Synopsis 
This is the first documentary film dedicated to Moroccan cinema; Between Desire and Uncertainty hands the microphone over to the filmmakers and film critics. Besides offering a brief historical approach, this documentary strives to identify the different movements that push Moroccan cinema. Likewise, it also makes very clear the dangers that threaten cinema's evolution.

External links 

 http://www.film-documentaire.fr/4DACTION/w_fiche_film/40691_1

2010 films
Moroccan documentary films
2010 documentary films
Documentary films about African cinema
2010s French-language films